S. K. Sinha is an Indian politician who served as Governor of Arunachal Pradesh from 16 May 1999 to 1 August 1999 and Acting Lieutenant governor of Arunachal Pradesh. He also served as Chief of the Army Staff.

References 

Indian politicians